Sawab (translation: Right Path), is a small Ba'athist and Arab nationalist political party in Mauritania.

The party was formed on 23 May 2004 by supporters of former Mauritanian Head of State Mohamed Khouna Ould Haidalla, although the party denies any links with Haidalla.

Most of the party's Ba'athists were formerly associated with the Iraqi dominated faction. Support for the party is mainly confined to a small Arab group.

As of 2013 the party was led by Abdessalam Ould Horma, and was a member of the opposition Coalition for Pacific Alternation, along with People's Progressive Alliance and El-Wiam.

References

Official party sites
Sawab Facebook Account

Arab nationalism in Mauritania
Ba'athist parties
Socialist parties in Mauritania